Irvine Park may refer to:

Irvine Park (Orange, California), listed on the National Register of Historic Places (NRHP)
Irvine Park Historic District, Saint Paul, Minnesota, also NRHP-listed
Irvine Park (Chippewa Falls, Wisconsin)